The 2017–18 Chattanooga Mocs women's basketball team represented the University of Tennessee at Chattanooga during the 2017–18 NCAA Division I women's basketball season. The Mocs, led by fifth-year head coach Jim Foster, played their home games at the McKenzie Arena as members of the Southern Conference (SoCon). The Mocs finished the season 17–13, 8–6 in third place in the SoCon, losing to UNC Greensboro in the conference tournament. They received an at-large berth in the 2018 WNIT and lost in the first round to UAB.

On February 1, 2018, Foster notched his 900th career win as a head coach, becoming the eighth fastest to reach that mark and tying for seventh in all-time career wins. He retired shortly after season's end in May 2018.

Previous season
The Mocs finished the 2016–17 season with a 21–11 overall record and 12–2 in the SoCon, making them co-champions of the regular season with Mercer. The Mocs swept the conference tournament, beating Mercer in the championship game and securing a first-round bid to the NCAA tournament. However, the Mocs lost the opening game to Louisville.

Roster

Schedule
 
|-
!colspan=9 style="background:#00386B; color:#E0AA0F;"| Regular Season
|-

|-
!colspan=9 style="background:#00386B; color:#E0AA0F;"| SoCon Regular Season
|-

|-
!colspan=9 style="background:#00386B; color:#E0AA0F;"| SoCon Tournament

|-
!colspan=9 style="background:#00386B; color:#E0AA0F;"| WNIT

Source:

References

Chattanooga Mocs women's basketball seasons
Chattanooga
Chattanooga Mocs
Chattanooga Mocs
Chattanooga